"God Made Girls" is a song recorded by American country music artist RaeLynn. It was released to country radio on June 30, 2014. RaeLynn co-wrote the song with Nicolle Galyon, Lori McKenna and Liz Rose.

Critical reception
Billy Dukes of Taste of Country gave the song a favorable review, writing that "RaeLynn holds back sassy, but still injects plenty of personality into her sweet single" and her "interpretation is emotional from start to finish." Dukes added that "RaeLynn's vocal stylings aren't for everyone, but the producer of this track smartly paired her with a traditional arrangement." Matt Bjorke of Roughstock also reviewed the song favorably, saying that "the production, from Joey Moi, gives the song a contemporary feel while RaeLynn's Texas twang reminds us that RaeLynn's no pop singer." Bjorke went on to say "the track features strong lyrics about what Girls do to make the world go round, how they start flirting with a shy guy, all the great qualities about a girl that makes guys go insane." Markos Papadatos of Digital Journal gave the song an A rating, writing that "she has a little Miranda Lambert in her voice, coupled by her sweet twang. She has found a way to blend traditional country music with modern country on this new tune, and it works effectively." 

Other critics were more negative. Miles Raymer of Entertainment Weekly named the song's opening stanza,  "Somebody's gotta wear a pretty skirt / Somebody's gotta be the one to flirt / Somebody's gotta wanna hold his hand so God made girls", as one of the worst song lyrics of 2014. Anthony Fantano of TheNeedleDrop listed the song as one of the worst singles of the 2010s, calling it "disgustingly regressive".

Music video
The music video was directed by TK McKamy and premiered in August 2014. It was filmed in Columbia, Tennessee.

Chart performance
"God Made Girls" debuted at number 56 on the U.S. Billboard Country Airplay chart for the week of July 19, 2014. It also debuted at number 34 on the U.S. Billboard Hot Country Songs chart for the week of July 19, 2014. The song debuted at number 98 on the Billboard Hot 100, and peaked at number 61. The single was certified Gold by the RIAA on January 29, 2015. It has sold 481,000 copies in the U.S. as of February 2015.

Year-end charts

Certifications

References

2014 songs
2014 singles
RaeLynn songs
Big Machine Records singles
Songs written by Lori McKenna
Songs written by Liz Rose
Song recordings produced by Joey Moi
Music videos directed by TK McKamy
Songs written by Nicolle Galyon